

The Cierva C.3 was an experimental autogyro built by Juan de la Cierva in Spain in 1921. It was based on the fuselage of a Sommer monoplane, and was actually completed and tested before that aircraft. The C.3 utilised a single, three-bladed rotor in place of the coaxial double rotor tested on the C.1. A few short hops were achieved in testing and Cierva noted a tendency for the machine to want to roll over, thus alerting him to the problem of dissymmetry of lift that he would have to overcome in order to build a successful rotary-wing aircraft. The C.3 was damaged and rebuilt four times before being abandoned without having flown, la Cierva returning to work on the C.2.

References

See also

1920s Spanish experimental aircraft
Single-engined tractor autogyros
C.3